The Little Book by English writer David Hughes, the  last novel by that writer. It was originally published by Hutchinson in 1996.  Written in the first person, it deals with the management of the space between the diagnosis of a serious medical condition and the time left to the sufferer.

1996 British novels
English novels
Medical novels
Hutchinson (publisher) books